Piece  is a village in the administrative district of Gmina Szczytno, within Szczytno County, Warmian-Masurian Voivodeship, in northern Poland. It is located in the historic region of Masuria.

The village has a population of 180.

History
In the past, the village was at various times part of Poland, Prussia and Germany, before it became again part of Poland following Germany's defeat in World War II in 1945.

References

Piece